Class 745 may refer to:

British Rail Class 745
FS Class 745